The Spook's Sacrifice is the sixth instalment in the Wardstone Chronicles arc of the Spook's series by Joseph Delaney.  Its release date is 25 August 2009. In the US it is titled The Last Apprentice: Clash of the Demons.

Plot
After being attacked in the middle of the night by a maenad (follower of the Old Goddess known as the Ordeen), Tom visits his family's farm and is asked by his mother to accompany her back to Greece to fight the Ordeen. The Ordeen is unique among the Old Gods in that she can come into the human world without the need of human intervention. Previously, her power was held in check by priests who built monasteries on the cliffs surrounding the plains of Meteora, where she manifests. But with the Fiend loose in the world, the Dark is now better organised; many vaengir (flying lamia witches) have been sent to the Ordeen to counter the power of the few remaining priests. When the Ordeen appears this time, the priests will be overwhelmed and the Ordeen free to go anywhere. The Ordeen will then go to the county to kill the children of her greatest enemy: Tom's own mother, Mam.

Tom is forced to choose between his master the Spook, who forbids him to go because he would have to ally himself with the Pendle witches, and his Mam. He decides to do what his Mam asks, setting off for the coast while the Spook heads back to Chipenden.

Tom is told Grimalkin wishes to speak with him before he leaves and sets out to meet her. As he walks there, he runs into the witch Mab Mouldheel and her two sisters Beth and Jannet. She initially uses glamour on him; however he overcomes it by focusing on her less appealing characteristics. She tells Tom that she scryed Alice's death at the hands of a feral lamia, being dragged into its lair to have her blood sucked out.

Grimalkin reminds Tom that she had promised to give him something on Walpurgis Night following his fourteenth birthday, but the Spook had refused to let Tom make his promised meeting with the witch assassin. She gives him a dark wish, so named because no one can foresee how it will be used and a special knife capable of hurting denizens of the dark.

Alice tells Tom that she still has the blood jar, a jar that contains the blood of one of the Fiend's daughters (Tom already knows it is Alice's blood). If mixed with Tom's blood, it could prevent the Fiend from coming near him. As Tom is all that stands between victory for the Fiend and his potential permanent death, he is eager to corrupt Tom, unable to directly use his vast power to kill Tom due to being hobbled by Tom's Mam: if the Fiend kills Tom, he will rule for only a century; if he turns Tom to the Dark, he will rule forever; if Tom fails to stop him, he will rule, but the length of time won't be fixed by fate.

Their party, joined by Tom's former temporary master, the spook Bill Arkwright, board a ship for Greece. Just as it is leaving, the Spook arrives and leaps from the dock onto the deck of the ship (his service to the County outweighs his personal principles against the Dark(. Despite his decision to join them, he still refuses to even talk to Tom, let alone continue his apprenticeship. Tom takes the time now available to him during the journey to practice with Bill Arkwright the more physical aspects of Spook's work, such as sparring with staffs.

Slowly the Spook begins to acknowledge Tom, until one day he tells him to get out his notebook and gives him a lesson on some of the dangers they will face. During the journey, their ship is attacked by pirates. They are out-gunned with only four cannons, however, the pirates seek to capture their ship rather than destroy it. As they enter, they are repelled by the County witches, including Grimalkin, who have been hiding from the sun and saltwater in the main hold. The pirate captain is killed.

As they land in Greece, the presence of Sirens along previously safe coasts indicates just how much the power of the Dark has grown there. Mam takes Tom to the house where she first took his dad after he saved her from death when she was staked to the rocks, and where she agreed to marry him and move to the County. It is here she reveals who she is to Tom; a Lamia and mother to all the lamia witches in the world (this makes Mam the ancient sorceress Lamia, who had an affair with Zeus before being punished by the gods and killing several men). She explains to Tom that she has tried to atone for her past deeds, his birth being the epitome of what she is trying to achieve.

They continue on to a prearranged meeting place with a number of mercenaries Mam has hired to protect their party from the maenads and lamia witches, but they are attacked by these creatures before they can reach the mercenaries. Mam and the witches do their best to drive them off and make it to their meeting point, and they send Tom and Alice on ahead.

Tom and Alice wander the many mountain passes until they realise they are lost. They decide to turn around and head back when two lamia witches appear, one in front and one behind. Whilst fending off the lamia in front, the one behind grabs Alice and begins to drag her down. Tom successfully drives off the front lamia, turning around just in time to see Alice's pointy shoes disappear. He uses his dark wish, wishing for Alice to be safe and unhurt. It seems as if nothing happens when Tom becomes aware time has stopped and the Fiend has appeared, still in the guise of the dead bargeman. He is pleased that Tom has finally used the Dark. He disappears just as Alice crawls out of the hole, surprised to still be alive.

Tom and Alice set off again, but are still lost. Eventually, they become aware they are being followed, and seek the safety of a cave. They begin to hear knocks on the surrounding cave walls as they are running, until finally the knocks cause a cave-in that separates them from their pursuers. Tom, but not Alice, is knocked unconscious. When he comes to, they follow the cave through the mountain and eventually reach the meeting point with the mercenaries.

They meet up with the Spook who informs them that when all seemed lost, the mercenaries arrived and fought their enemies off. He also tells Tom and Alice the knocks they heard were made by Knockers, a dangerous type of elemental and they are both lucky to be alive. Mab Mouldheel sees Alice still alive and angrily accuses Tom of using the Dark, hoping that with Alice out of the way, she could have him to herself.

Mam tells them of her plan: during the first stage, an emissary party of seven sent by the city of Megara will be replaced with members of their own party; Tom, Alice, Bill Arkwright, the Spook and several mercenaries. Blood from the youngest (Tom) will be offered to awaken the Ordeen. Then, if the youngest wishes to live, a challenger (Grimalkin) must fight a champion of the Ordeen. Then Pendle witches will go through and clear the Ord (the fortress of the Ordeen) of the demons that arrive with her, creatures of the Dark that look like beautiful men and women but possess terrible strength and cruelty. Finally, Mam will go with Mab Mouldheel to confront the Ordeen (she needs Mab's considerable powers of foresight due to the Fiend clouding her own, to locate the Ordeen within the Ord).
Before the arrival of the Ordeen, Mam takes Tom up to the monasteries of the priests, as he is still doubtful that mere prayer is what kept the Ordeen confined to the plains of Megara. However, upon meeting the head of their order and listening to their hymns, he begins to understand the power of faith in combating the Dark.

The Ord appears in a huge pillar of fire. It is divided into three large towers and a central dome, the Ordeen residing somewhere inside. When the fire dissipates, Mam's plan begins.

Tom enters the Ord with the other members of the emissary and they are met by a number of demons. Music begins and the mercenaries sit down and begin eating a feast, their captain previously having been at odds with the Spook regarding how effective fasting is when it comes to fighting the dark. The demons attack the mercenaries, gorging themselves on blood.

Tom gives some of his own blood, which is used to begin the process of waking the Ordeen. Grimalkin then fights the Ordeen's champion, a giant man in armour, and kills him by stabbing him through the visor of his helmet. 
They then find the remnants of a dead witch; a fire elemental (followers of the Ordeen, they look like glowing red stars) had dropped down on her and burnt her to death. They soon find more and more dead witches until eventually, they see one come running past screaming. The Spook grabs her and asks what happened. She tells him that it was a trap, they ran to the top of the tower and there were fire elementals everywhere; all the other witches are dead. They must take a different route, and go up another tower.

Tom, Alice, Bill Arkwright and the Spook reach the top of another tower to find themselves in a pitch black room. All of a sudden Tom feels an iron hard grip on his ankle, dragging him to a metal dish which is then winched up. When high enough, Tom realises the surrounding walls are covered with vaengir; he is to be their meal. Again, however, he notices time has stopped and realises the Fiend is back. Still taking the appearance of the dead bargeman, he offers Tom a way out. He will free him and his companions and delay the awakening of the Ordeen for another hour in exchange for his soul in three days.

Seeing no alternative, Tom agrees. His and his companions’ dishes are lowered and they come to the conclusion that the towers are a trap; elementals in the first, vaengir in the second and who knows what in the third. Instead, they head up to the dome, eventually hitting an invisible force field.

Because it was Tom's blood that was used, a part of him is in the Ordeen and so he can pass through the barrier, leaving Alice and the Spooks behind as he does so. He meets up with Mab Mouldheel and she tells him Mam is inside, currently changing her form. Mam forced her way through the barrier, though it took a great deal out of her.

Tom finds himself facing the vision that the Bane had shown him: his mother as a winged, scaled Lamia witch. She does not want Tom to see her this way, and tells him she is changing into her final form – one that might be able to hold the Ordeen off long enough for the Ord to fall into oblivion. Tom realises that this will mean she will go with it into oblivion. Mam tells him not to be sad as she has lived a long life and will now achieve her ultimate goal. Now she needs Tom to stall the Ordeen while she completes her transformation into a Lamia.

Tom enters the room where the Ordeen is waking, and the Old Goddess is confused by the feeling that she should know Tom (because it was Tom's blood that was used to wake her). Eventually she realises Tom is the son of her enemy and attacks, but not before revealing that Tom can also stop the passage of time. He fends her of for a short time, losing his chain, staff and knife.

Mam arrives, swooping down with her huge wings to attack the Ordeen. Holding down the Ordeen, she shouts at Tom to flee the Ord. As he and his companions do so they are chased by elementals. Bill Arkwright sacrifices his own life by remaining in the Ord to hold them at bay so the others can escape.

Tom, Alice and the Spook inform the priests what has happened before leaving. At almost midnight two days after he made his deal with the Fiend, Tom decides to slip away from the camp with Alice and the Spook, believing that if the Fiend should appear around them they would vainly try to protect Tom and likely get killed in the process. He makes his way to the banks of a stream and waits for the Fiend to arrive. In the Fiend's previous encounters with Tom, he had taken on the appearance of the dead bargeman, but this time he appears as a huge, hairy creature with cloven feet, horns and a tail.

Before the Fiend can take Tom's soul, Alice appears, waving the blood jar at him and shouting at him to leave. Furious, he does so. Alice reveals that when Tom was unconscious earlier, she took some of his blood and mixed it with her own in the jar. From now on, Tom and Alice must remain together and near the blood jar, which only has a short range, or else the Fiend will reappear and take their souls. 

The following day, the Spook gives Tom two letters from Mam; one addressed to the Spook and a second addressed to Tom. The Spook says the first letter convinced him to come; it informed him of Mam's impending death and her request that the Spook make two exceptions to his principles: to continue Tom's apprenticeship and to not bind Alice, whom the Spook detests as a future-malevolent witch for her use of dark magic, to a pit. Mam's letter explains to the Spook that Alice she is the daughter of the Fiend (which the Spook had already suspected) and potentially the most powerful and malevolent witch ever. However, the Spook should not bind her to a pit for that as she could be just as powerful a servant of the light and vital in helping Tom fight the Fiend.

Mam's second letter tells Tom that she had foreseen her death long ago and that he should not grieve. She says that she had been happiest when with his dad and her sons and that he should continue to work hard at his apprenticeship. She wants him to one day hunt the Dark, not be hunted by it.

After reading the letters, Tom still fears that Mam will not be able to pass into Heaven and would instead be trapped inside the Ord in oblivion. He boards the ship home, along with about twenty surviving Pendle witches led by Grimalkin. Trying to sleep on the ship, Tom feels a presence that he can describe only as pure love, finally convincing him that his mother has in fact moved on.

Characters 
Thomas Ward. The seventh son of a seventh son, he is also the son of Lamia, meaning that along with his ability to see things other can't and being immune to some dark powers such as a witches long-sniffing, he also has inherited powers from his mother, one of which is the ability to slow down and stop time. He has a destiny to either save the world or damn it.

Alice Deane. Revealed in the 5th book to be the daughter of Bony Lizzie and the Fiend, she is a firm friend of Tom; their friendship kept her from going over to the dark. According to Thomas' Mam, she could be the most powerful malevolent or benign witch ever.

John Gregory Also known as the Spook. A seventh son of a seventh son, he has kept the forces of the dark at bay for many years in the county. He has trained many apprentices, though precious few are any good, Tom will be his last.

Thomas' Mam also known as Lamia. A beautiful enchantress who fell in love with and bore children to the Old God Zeus. She fell under the influence of the Dark after Zeus' wife Hera, in a fit of rage, killed all but one of her children. In revenge she killed so many young children that the rivers of Greece were said to run red with blood and the air trembled with the cries of their parents. The Old Gods eventually cursed her as a result, giving her the lower body of a serpent, which she then used to strangle young men she had seduced. It was not until the kindness of Tom's dad, who saved her from death, that she fully turned to the light, bearing him six sons to give birth to Tom. Despite her terrible crimes early in her life, she redeemed herself and therefore was able to move on after sacrificing herself to destroy the Ordeen.

Bill Arkwright. A seventh son of a seventh son, he was one of the Spooks successful apprentices, acting as spook up north in Caster. Following his death, his remaining bloodhound Claw and his two puppies Blood and Bone saw Tom as their new master, something Alice claims to have always known.

Grimalkin. The assassin of the Malkin witch clan, she is a malevolent witch skilled with knives and scissors in combat. She nonetheless follows a strict code of honour, to the point which, when ordered to kill Tom, she regretted it as she would not be able to face him when he was at his prime, offering him a quick death (although he did survive). She has gained protection from the Fiend by bearing him a son. However, her son was not a witch but an ordinary boy. The Fiend killed him, resulting in a grudge that has led to Grimalkin allying herself with Tom on more than one occasion.

The Ordeen. The Ordeen is an old goddess who has the power to awaken and kill mankind. The only way for her to die is to destroy the portal so that the Ordeen does not escape into the world.

External links 
 Full Length Commentary on Clash of the Demons
 The first 84 pages of the book at HarperCollins

2009 British novels
Children's fantasy novels
British children's novels
Novels set in Greece
The Bodley Head books
2009 children's books
British fantasy novels